Alain Deloche (born 2 September 1940 in Paris) is a French surgeon. Ex member of Médecins Sans Frontières, he cofounded Médecins du Monde and is board member of the Surgeons of Hope Foundation since 1988.

See also
Albert Schweitzer

Notes

External links
Surgeons of Hope Foundation

1940 births
Living people
French surgeons
French humanitarians
People from Paris